The H&BR Class F1 (LNER Class N11) was a class of 0-6-2T steam locomotives of the Hull and Barnsley Railway.  The locomotives were part of a batch built by Kitson and Company for the Lancashire, Derbyshire and East Coast Railway (LD&ECR), but the order was cancelled because the LD&ECR was unable to pay for them.

Equipment
The locomotives had domed boilers and square-topped cabs and were fitted with vacuum brakes.

Use
They were used for banking, goods trains and passenger trains. When the H&BR Class A locomotives were introduced for coal trains, the F1s were displaced to shunting duties.

Withdrawal
All were withdrawn and scrapped between 1943 and 1946.

References

F1
0-6-2T locomotives
Railway locomotives introduced in 1901
Kitson locomotives
Standard gauge steam locomotives of Great Britain
Scrapped locomotives